The 1947 Bethune–Cookman Wildcats football team was an American football team that represented Bethune Cookman College as a member of the Southeastern Athletic Conference (SEAC) during the 1947 college football season. In their second season under head coach Bunky Matthews, the team compiled a 10–2 record, shut out eight of twelve opponents, and outscored all opponents by a total of 331 to 66. The team won the SEAC championship and was also ranked No. 2 among the nation's smaller black college football teams by the Pittsburgh Courier using the Dickinson Rating System. The team played its home games in Daytona Beach, Florida.

Key players included quarterback "Sport" Anderson.

Bethune Cookman had a total enrollment of approximately 800 students in the fall of 1947.

Schedule

References

Bethune-Cookman
Bethune–Cookman Wildcats football seasons
Bethune-Cookman Wildcats football